Otvazhny was a Soviet  built for the Black Sea Fleet during the 1960s. She sank on 30 August 1974 after a defective anti-aircraft missile launched during Black Sea Fleet drills ignited a fire which resulted in the explosion of the ship magazines.

References

Bibliography

1964 ships
Ships built at Shipyard named after 61 Communards
Kashin-class destroyers of the Soviet Navy
Cold War destroyers of the Soviet Union
Ships sunk by non-combat internal explosions

Shipwrecks in the Black Sea
Maritime incidents in 1974